St Joseph's College, Lochinvar is an independent Roman Catholic co-educational secondary day school, located in the village of Lochinvar, in the Hunter region of New South Wales, Australia.

Established in 1883 by the Sisters of St Joseph of the Sacred Heart, founded by Father Julian Tenison-Woods, the College caters for approximately 700 students from Year 7 to Year 12. In 1990, St Joseph's College merged with Catholic secondary schools in the area, St Peter's and St Mary's in nearby Maitland, to form All Saints' College. In 2018, St Joseph's College de-merged and expanded its educational offering to cater for students in Year 11 and Year 12. 2019 was the first year in which students commenced the NSW Higher School Certificate.

Overview 
The school day at St Joseph's Lochinvar starts at 8:50 am and ends at 3:13 pm. The students attend 5 periods on Monday, Tuesday, Thursday and Friday. On Wednesday’s a Flexi Learning Time is engaged in to allow for students to interact with their peers from same year groups and others, this results in the day being a 4 period day.  Every second Friday morning the school leaders and executive hold a whole school assembly in the newly constructed MacKillop Place. Assemblies use to occur in the COLA (Covered Outdoor Learning Area) which was constructed in mid-2009. On alternative Fridays students engage with Year Group Assemblies that allow them to discuss matters for their year group and to allow for peer bonding. 

The first lay principal was Helen Hemphill (1990–1994) followed Michael Healy in 1995, who was replaced at the end of 2004. Peter Hamill was the next principal until 2005. Patricia Hales is the current principal.

St Joseph's is renowned for its sporting programs, particularly in regards to rugby league and its renowned creative and performing arts especially in Music, Art and Drama. The rugby league sides are quite successful as they are coached by Scott Asimus, a former NRL player.

See also 

 All Saints College, Maitland
 List of Catholic schools in New South Wales
 Catholic education in Australia

References

External links
Sisters of St Joseph of the Sacred Heart

Catholic secondary schools in New South Wales
Educational institutions established in 1883
1883 establishments in Australia
Sisters of St Joseph of the Sacred Heart